Rear Window is a 1954 film directed by Alfred Hitchcock.

Rear Window also may refer to:

 Rear Window (1998 film), an American television remake of the 1954 film
 "Rear Window" (Roseanne), a 1995 television episode
 "Rear Window" (Tru Calling), a 2004 television episode
 Rear Window Captioning System, a film captioning system for deaf theatregoers

See also
 "Rear Windows '98", a 1998 episode of Diagnosis: Murder